Diastole is a genus of air-breathing land snails or semi-slugs, terrestrial pulmonate gastropod mollusks in the family Euconulidae.

Species 
Species in the genus Diastole include: 
 Diastole bryani H. B. Baker, 1938
 Diastole conula (Pease, 1861)
 Diastole exposita (Mousson, 1873)
 Diastole fornicata (Ancey, 1889)
 Diastole futunae H. B. Baker, 1938
 Diastole glaucina Baker, 1938
 Diastole lamellaxis Baker, 1938
 Diastole lauae H. B. Baker, 1938
 Diastole matafaoi Baker, 1938, Mount Matafao different snail
 Diastole necrodes H. B. Baker, 1938
 Diastole rurutui H. B. Baker, 1938
 Diastole savaii Baker, 1938
 Diastole schmeltziana (Mousson, 1865)
 Diastole simonei Thach & F. Huber, 2017 (taxon inquirendum)
 Diastole subcarinata Solem, 1959
 Diastole tenuistriata Preece, 1995
 Diastole tongana (Quoy & Gaimard, 1832)

References

 Baker, H. B. (1938). Zonitid snails from Pacific Islands. Part 1. Southern genera of Microcystinae. Bernice P. Bishop Museum bulletin. 158: 1-102, 20 pls.
 Bank, R. A. (2017). Classification of the Recent terrestrial Gastropoda of the World. Last update: July 16th, 2017

External links
 Bishop museum guide to Samoan land snails, Diastole species with images and other info
 Gude, G. K. (1913). Definitions of further new genera of Zonitidae. Proceedings of the Malacological Society of London. 10: 389-391
  Iredale, T. (1913). The land Mollusca of the Kermadec islands. Proceedings of the Malacological Society of London. 10(6): 364-388, pl. 18

 
Gastropod genera
Molluscs of Oceania
Helicarionidae